Pelas may also refer to:

Lindsey Pelas (born 1991), American model and actress
Palas, Iran, a village

See also 
 Pela (disambiguation)